HMS Poseidon (P99) was a  designed and built by Vickers Shipbuilding and Engineering in Barrow-in-Furness, England for the Royal Navy, launched on 22 August 1929. She spent most of her short career assigned to the Yellow Sea region, based at the Royal Navy's Weihai naval base in mainland China. In 1931, the submarine sank after a collision with the steamship Yuta north of Weihai. The submarine was later secretly salvaged by the Chinese in 1972.

Service history

The aircraft carrier , heavy cruiser  and sister submarine  led the rescue operations. Poseidon was equipped with Davis Submerged Escape Apparatus which had come into service two years earlier. This was a closed circuit underwater breathing system which provided the wearer with a supply of pure oxygen and a canvas drogue to slow the rate of ascent. Despite the submarine not being equipped with specialised escape compartments or flooding valves, eight of the crew managed to leave the forward end of the boat, although two failed to reach the surface and one died later. Twenty-one crew died in total.

A consequence of the successful escape of part of the crew was to change Admiralty policy from advising crews to wait for the arrival of assistance to attempting to escape from the submarine as soon as possible. This policy was announced in the House of Commons in March 1934.

Salvage
The secret salvaging of the submarine in 1972 by China's then newly formed underwater recovery units was described in 2002 in an article in the popular Chinese magazine Modern Ships.
This was not known about in the West until the researcher and journalist Steven Schwankert discovered that article with a Google web search and later read it in a Hong Kong library.

In the former British naval cemetery on the island of Liugong, gravestones, bearing clearly legible names, dates and epitaphs of the lost sailors were found in haphazard stacks by historians looking into the sinking of HMS Poseidon and its salvage by the Chinese.  The British Ministry of Defence has not received an answer to what became of the remains of the crew. Results of this research are told in Schwankert's book Poseidon: China's Secret Salvage of Britain's Lost Submarine and the documentary film The Poseidon Project.

See also
 Project Azorian – US CIA's secret Soviet submarine salvage project (1974)

References

External links

Parthian-class submarines
Ships built in Barrow-in-Furness
1929 ships
British submarine accidents
Maritime incidents in 1931
Shipwrecks in the Yellow Sea
Submarines sunk in collisions